Kálmán Székány (1 February 1885 – 31 July 1967) was a Hungarian football manager. Though born in Hungary, he is known mostly for his managerial career in France. In 1932, Székány became the first professional manager of Rennes. He later served as manager of Bordeaux and AS Brest helping the latter club reach the quarter-finals of the Coupe de France in 1936.

References 

Footballers from Budapest
Stade Rennais F.C. managers
FC Girondins de Bordeaux managers
Hungarian football managers
Hungarian expatriate football managers
Expatriate football managers in France
1885 births
1967 deaths
Association footballers not categorized by position
Association football players not categorized by nationality